Alto Caparaó is a Brazilian municipality in the state of Minas Gerais. The city belongs to the mesoregion of Zona da Mata and to the microregion of Manhuaçu.  its population is estimated to be 5,894.

See also
 List of municipalities in Minas Gerais

References

Municipalities in Minas Gerais